Seehausen may refer to:

Seehausen, Altmark, a town and a Verwaltungsgemeinschaft in Saxony-Anhalt, Germany
Seehausen (Verbandsgemeinde), a collective municipality in Stendal, Saxony-Anhalt, Germany
Seehausen, Börde, part of the Verwaltungsgemeinschaft Börde Wanzleben, Saxony-Anhalt, Germany
Seehausen am Staffelsee, a municipality in Bavaria, Germany
Seehausen, Leipzig, a former village and now a part of the city of Leipzig
Seehausen bei Prenzlau, a town in the Uckermark district, in Brandenburg, Germany
Seehausen (Oberuckersee), a former fisher-village, now quarter of the Oberuckersee community in Uckermark, Germany